The Antigonid dynasty was a Hellenistic dynasty of Dorian Greek provenance, descended from Alexander the Great's general Antigonus I Monophthalmus ("the One-Eyed") that ruled mainly in Macedonia.

History

Succeeding the Antipatrid dynasty in much of Macedonia, Antigonus ruled mostly over Asia Minor and northern Syria.  His attempts to take control of the whole of Alexander's empire led to his defeat and death at the Battle of Ipsus in 301 BC. Antigonus's son Demetrius I Poliorcetes survived the battle, and managed to seize control of Macedon itself a few years later, but eventually lost his throne, dying as a prisoner of Seleucus I Nicator. After a period of confusion, Demetrius's son Antigonus II Gonatas was able to establish the family's control over the old Kingdom of Macedon, as well as over most of the Greek city-states, by 276 BC.

Legacy
It was one of four dynasties established by Alexander's successors, the others being the Seleucid dynasty, Ptolemaic dynasty and Attalid dynasty. The last scion of the dynasty, Perseus of Macedon, who reigned between 179 and 168 BC, proved unable to stop the advancing Roman legions and Macedon's defeat at the Battle of Pydna signaled the end of the dynasty.

Dynasty
The ruling members of the Antigonid dynasty were:

The Greek rebel against Rome and last King of Macedonia, Andriscus, claimed to be the son of Perseus.

Family tree of Antigonids

Coin gallery

See also 
List of kings of Macedon

References

Further reading

Adams, Winthrop Lindsay. 2010. "Alexander's Successors to 221 BC." In A Companion to Ancient Macedonia. Edited by Joseph Roisman and Ian Worthington, 208–224. Malden, MA: Wiley-Blackwell. 
Anson, Edward M. 2014. Alexander's Heirs: The Age of the Successors. Malden, MA: Wiley-Blackwell.
Edson, Charles F. 1934. "The Antigonids, Heracles, and Beroia." Harvard Studies in Classical Philology 45:213–246.
O'Neil, James L. 2003. "The Ethnic Origins of the Friends of the Antigonid Kings of Macedon." The Classical Quarterly 53, no. 2: 510–22. https://www.jstor.org/stable/3556219.
The Antigonid Network. https://blogs.exeter.ac.uk/theantigonidnetwork/. Containing information about academic research, seminars, and related bibliographies and links.

 
 
Ancient Macedonian dynasties
3rd century BC in Macedonia (ancient kingdom)
2nd century BC in Macedonia (ancient kingdom)
300s BC establishments
306 BC
4th-century BC establishments
2nd-century BC disestablishments
168 BC